Lavrov, Nikolai Vladimirovich (1802–1840) was a well-known Russian baritone opera singer.

He sang in Moscow at the Bolshoi Theatre. He possessed a voice of beautiful timbre and wide range, and was especially famous for his roles in the operas Robert le diable by Giacomo Meyerbeer, Zampa by Louis Herold and Askold's Grave by Alexey Verstovsky.

1802 births
1840 deaths
Operatic baritones
19th-century male opera singers from the Russian Empire